Amalric or Amaury I (113611 July 1174) was King of Jerusalem from 1163, and Count of Jaffa and Ascalon before his accession. He was the second son of Melisende and Fulk of Jerusalem, and succeeded his older brother Baldwin III. During his reign, Jerusalem became more closely allied with the Byzantine Empire, and the two states launched an unsuccessful invasion of Egypt. He was the father of three future rulers of Jerusalem, Sibylla, Baldwin IV, and Isabella I.

Older scholarship mistook the two names Amalric and Aimery as variant spellings of the same name, so these historians erroneously added numbers, making Amalric to be Amalric I (1163–74) and King Aimery (1197–1205) to be "Amalric II". Now scholars recognize that the two names were not the same and no longer add the number for either king. Confusion between the two names was common even among contemporaries.

Youth
Amalric was born in 1136 to King Fulk, the former count of Anjou married to the heiress of the kingdom, Queen Melisende. After the death of Fulk in a hunting accident in 1143, the throne passed jointly to Melisende and Amalric's older brother Baldwin III, who was still only 13 years old. Melisende did not step down when Baldwin came of age two years later, and by 1150 the two were becoming increasingly hostile towards each other. In 1152 Baldwin had himself crowned sole king, and civil war broke out, with Melisende retaining Jerusalem while Baldwin held territory further north. Amalric, who had been given the County of Jaffa as an apanage when he reached the age of majority in 1151, remained loyal to Melisende in Jerusalem, and when Baldwin invaded the south, Amalric was besieged in the Tower of David with his mother. Melisende was defeated in this struggle and Baldwin ruled alone thereafter. In 1153 Baldwin captured the Egyptian fortress of Ascalon, which was then added to Amalric's fief of Jaffa (see Battle of Ascalon).

Amalric married Agnes of Courtenay in 1157. Agnes, daughter of Joscelin II of Edessa, had lived in Jerusalem since the western regions of the former crusader County of Edessa were lost in 1150. Patriarch Fulcher objected to the marriage on grounds of consanguinity, as the two shared a great-great-grandfather, Guy I of Montlhéry, and it seems that they waited until Fulcher's death to marry. Agnes bore Amalric three children: Sibylla, the future Baldwin IV (both of whom would come to rule the kingdom in their own right), and Alix, who died in childhood.

Succession
Baldwin III died on 10 February 1163 and the kingdom passed to Amalric, although there was some opposition among the nobility to Agnes; they were willing to accept the marriage in 1157 when Baldwin III was still capable of siring an heir, but now the Haute Cour refused to endorse Amalric as king unless his marriage to Agnes was annulled.  The hostility to Agnes, it must be admitted, may be exaggerated by the chronicler William of Tyre, whom she prevented from becoming Latin Patriarch of Jerusalem decades later, as well as from William's continuators like Ernoul, who hints at a slight on her moral character: "car telle n'est que roine doie iestre di si haute cite comme de Jherusalem" ("there should not be such a queen for so holy a city as Jerusalem"). Nevertheless, consanguinity was enough for the opposition. Amalric agreed and ascended the throne without a wife, although Agnes continued to hold the title Countess of Jaffa and Ascalon and received a pension from that fief's income. Agnes soon thereafter married Hugh of Ibelin, to whom she had been engaged before her marriage with Amalric. The church ruled that Amalric and Agnes' children were legitimate and preserved their place in the order of succession. Through her children Agnes would exert much influence in Jerusalem for almost 20 years.

Conflicts with the Muslim states

During Baldwin III's reign, the County of Edessa, the first crusader state established during the First Crusade, was conquered by Zengi, the Turkic emir of Aleppo. Zengi united Aleppo, Mosul, and other cities of northern Syria, and intended to impose his control on Damascus in the south. The Second Crusade in 1148 had failed to conquer Damascus, which soon fell to Zengi's son Nur ad-Din. Jerusalem also lost influence to Byzantium in northern Syria when the Empire imposed its suzerainty over the Principality of Antioch. Jerusalem thus turned its attention to Egypt, where the Fatimid dynasty was suffering from a series of young caliphs and civil wars. The crusaders had wanted to conquer Egypt since the days of Baldwin I, who died during an expedition there. The capture of Ascalon by Baldwin III made the conquest of Egypt more feasible.

Invasions of Egypt

Amalric led his first expedition into Egypt in 1163, claiming that the Fatimids had not paid the yearly tribute that had begun during the reign of Baldwin III. The vizier, Dirgham, had recently overthrown the vizier Shawar, and marched out to meet Amalric at Pelusium, but was defeated and forced to retreat to Bilbeis. The Egyptians then opened up the Nile dams and let the river flood, hoping to prevent Amalric from invading any further. Amalric returned home but Shawar fled to the court of Nur ad-Din, who sent his general Shirkuh to settle the dispute in 1164. In response Dirgham sought help from Amalric, but Shirkuh and Shawar arrived before Amalric could intervene and Dirgham was killed. Shawar, however, feared that Shirkuh would seize power for himself, and he too looked to Amalric for assistance. Amalric returned to Egypt in 1164 and besieged Shirkuh in Bilbeis until Shirkuh retreated to Damascus.

Amalric could not follow up on his success in Egypt because Nur ad-Din was active in Syria, having taken Bohemund III of Antioch and Raymond III of Tripoli prisoner at the Battle of Harim during Amalric's absence. Amalric rushed to take up the regency of Antioch and Tripoli and secured Bohemund's ransom in 1165 (Raymond remained in captivity until 1173). The year 1166 was relatively quiet, but Amalric sent envoys to the Byzantine Empire seeking an alliance and a Byzantine wife, and throughout the year had to deal with raids by Nur ad-Din, who captured Banias.

In 1167, Nur ad-Din sent Shirkuh back to Egypt and Amalric once again followed him, establishing a camp near Cairo; Shawar again allied with Amalric and a treaty was signed with the caliph al-Adid himself. Shirkuh encamped on the opposite side of the Nile. After an indecisive battle, Amalric retreated to Cairo and Shirkuh marched north to capture Alexandria; Amalric followed and besieged Shirkuh there, aided by a Pisan fleet from Jerusalem.  Shirkuh negotiated for peace and Alexandria was handed over to Amalric. However, Amalric could not remain there indefinitely, and returned to Jerusalem after exacting an enormous tribute.

Byzantine alliance

After his return to Jerusalem in 1167, Amalric married Maria Comnena, a great-grandniece of Byzantine emperor Manuel I Comnenus. The negotiations had taken two years, mostly because Amalric insisted that Manuel return Antioch to Jerusalem. Once Amalric gave up on this point he was able to marry Maria in the Cathedral of Tyre on August 29, 1167. During this time the queen dowager, Baldwin III's widow Theodora, eloped with her cousin Andronicus to Damascus, and Acre, which had been in her possession, reverted into the royal domain of Jerusalem. It was also around this time that William of Tyre was promoted to archdeacon of Tyre, and was recruited by Amalric to write a history of the kingdom.

In 1168 Amalric and Manuel negotiated an alliance against Egypt, and William of Tyre was among the ambassadors sent to Constantinople to finalize the treaty. Although Amalric still had a peace treaty with Shawar, Shawar was accused of attempting to ally with Nur ad-Din, and Amalric invaded. The Knights Hospitaller eagerly supported this invasion, while the Knights Templar refused to have any part in it. In October, without waiting for any Byzantine assistance (and in fact without even waiting for the ambassadors to return), Amalric invaded and seized Bilbeis. The inhabitants were either massacred or enslaved. Amalric then marched to Cairo, where Shawar offered Amalric two million pieces of gold. Meanwhile, Nur ad-Din sent Shirkuh back to Egypt as well, and upon his arrival Amalric retreated.

Rise of Saladin
In January 1169 Shirkuh had Shawar assassinated. Shirkuh became vizier, although he himself died in March, and was succeeded by his nephew Saladin. Amalric became alarmed and sent Frederick de la Roche, Archbishop of Tyre, to seek help from the kings and nobles of Europe, but no assistance was forthcoming. Later that year however a Byzantine fleet arrived, and in October Amalric launched yet another invasion and besieged Damietta by sea and by land. The siege was long and famine broke out in the Christian camp; the Byzantines and crusaders blamed each other for the failure, and a truce was signed with Saladin. Amalric returned home.

Now Jerusalem was surrounded by hostile enemies. In 1170 Saladin invaded Jerusalem and took the city of Eilat, severing Jerusalem's connection with the Red Sea. Saladin, who was set up as Vizier of Egypt, was declared Sultan in 1171 upon the death of the last Fatimid caliph. Saladin's rise to Sultan was an unexpected reprieve for Jerusalem, as Nur ad-Din was now preoccupied with reining in his powerful vassal. Nevertheless, in 1171 Amalric visited Constantinople himself, leaving Jobert of Syria as regent, and envoys were sent to the kings of Europe for a second time, but again no help was received. Over the next few years the kingdom was threatened not only by Saladin and Nur ad-Din, but also by the Assassins.  In one episode, the Knights Templar murdered some Assassin envoys, leading to further disputes between Amalric and the Templars.

Death
Nur ad-Din died in 1174, upon which Amalric immediately besieged Banias. On the way back after giving up the siege he fell ill from dysentery, which was ameliorated by doctors but turned into a fever in Jerusalem. William of Tyre explains that "after suffering intolerably from the fever for several days, he ordered physicians of the Greek, Syrian, and other nations noted for skill in diseases to be called and insisted that they give him some purgative remedy." Neither they nor Latin doctors could help, and he died on July 11, 1174.

Maria Comnena had borne Amalric two daughters: Isabella, who would eventually marry four husbands in turn and succeed as queen, was born in 1172; and a stillborn child some time later. On his deathbed Amalric bequeathed Nablus to Maria and Isabella, both of whom would retire there. The leprous child Baldwin IV succeeded his father and brought his mother Agnes of Courtenay (now married to her fourth husband) back to court.

Physical characteristics
William was a good friend of Amalric and described him in great detail. "He had a slight impediment in his speech, not serious enough to be considered as a defect but sufficient to render him incapable of ready eloquence. He was far better in counsel than in fluent or ornate speech." Like his brother Baldwin III, he was more of an academic than a warrior, who studied law and languages in his leisure time: "He was well skilled in the customary law by which the kingdom was governed – in fact, he was second to no one in this respect." He was probably responsible for an assize making all rear-vassals directly subject to the king and eligible to appear at the Haute Cour. Amalric had an enormous curiosity, and William was reportedly astonished to find Amalric questioning, during an illness, the resurrection of the body. He especially enjoyed reading and being read to, spending long hours listening to William read early drafts of his history. He did not enjoy games or spectacles, although he liked to hunt. He was trusting of his officials, perhaps too trusting, and it seems that there were many among the population who despised him, although he refused to take any action against those who insulted him publicly.

He was tall and fairly handsome; "he had sparkling eyes of medium size; his nose, like that of his brother, was becomingly aquiline; his hair was blond and grew back somewhat from his forehead. A comely and very full beard covered his cheeks and chin. He had a way of laughing immoderately so that his entire body shook." He did not overeat or drink to excess, but his corpulence grew in his later years, decreasing his interest in military operations; according to William, he "was excessively fat, with breasts like those of a woman hanging down to his waist."
Amalric was pious and attended mass every day, although he also "is said to have absconded himself without restraint to the sins of the flesh and to have seduced married women..." Despite his piety he taxed the clergy, which they naturally opposed.

As William says, "he was a man of wisdom and discretion, fully competent to hold the reins of government in the kingdom." He is considered the last of the early kings of Jerusalem. Within a few years, Emperor Manuel died as well, and Saladin remained the only strong leader in the east.

Sources

 Bernard Hamilton, "Women in the Crusader States: The Queens of Jerusalem", in Medieval Women, edited by Derek Baker. Ecclesiastical History Society, 1978
 
 
 William of Tyre, A History of Deeds Done Beyond the Sea, trans. E.A. Babcock and A.C. Krey. Columbia University Press, 1943

References

1136 births
1174 deaths
12th-century kings of Jerusalem
Counts of Jaffa and Ascalon
12th-century French nobility
Kings of Jerusalem
Deaths from dysentery
Crusader–Fatimid wars